1962 Speedway World Team Cup was the third edition  of the FIM Speedway World Team Cup to determine the team world champions. 

The final took place in Slaný, Czechoslovakia. The World Champion title was won by Sweden (36 pts) who beat Great Britain (24 pts), Poland (20 pts) and Czechoslovakia (16 pts).

Format

Qualification

Nordic Round
 23 April
  Vetlanda, Vetlanda Speedway

British Round
The British Round was cancelled. Great Britain was seeded to the World Final.

Central European Round
 15 July
  Plzeň
 West Germany was replaced by second team from Czechoslovakia

East European Round
 15 July
  Rybnik, Rybnik Municipal Stadium

World final
 29 July
  Slaný, Slaný Speedway

See also
 motorcycle speedway
 1962 Individual Speedway World Championship

References

1962
World Team
July 1962 sports events in Europe